is a 2019 Japanese drama film loosely based on the 2017 book of the same name by Isoko Mochizuki, directed by Michihito Fujii. It received 6 Japan Academy Prize nominations and won three, including Picture of the Year, Outstanding Performance by an Actor in a Leading Role and Outstanding Performance by an Actress in a Leading Role.

On January 13, 2022, a drama version of The Journalist was released on Netflix.

Plot 
Young journalist Erika Yoshioka works at Tokyo Metropolitan News where her father committed suicide under suspicion of falsifying news. Yoshioka's boss Mr. Jinya entrusts her with investigating a government plan to establish a new university that has arrived by anonymous fax. Her research leads to Mr. Kanzaki a Cabinet Official who soon commits suicide. The investigation next takes her to Takumi Sugiyama, an earnest official in the Cabinet Intelligence and Research Office. Plagued with doubts over Kanzaki's death, Sugiyama agrees to work with Yoshioka to uncover the scandal that may derail their careers.

Cast

References

External links
 

2019 films
2010s political drama films
2010s political thriller films
Japanese political films
Japanese drama films
Japanese thriller films
Films about journalism
Films about journalists
Films about newspaper publishing
Films about democracy
Films about suicide
Films about whistleblowing
Films about intelligence agencies
Films about freedom of expression
Films about censorship
Films about media manipulation
Films set in Tokyo
Films based on non-fiction books
Films scored by Taro Iwashiro
Freedom of the press
Political films based on actual events
Thriller films based on actual events
Drama films based on actual events
Picture of the Year Japan Academy Prize winners
2019 drama films
2010s Japanese films